Williamsburg Historic District is a national historic district located at Williamsburg, Blair County, Pennsylvania.  The district includes 362 contributing buildings and 6 contributing structures in the central business district and surrounding residential areas of Williamsburg.  The earliest buildings date to the 1830s, when the community was expanded as a canal town along the Pennsylvania Main Line Canal. The buildings are primarily frame and brick, with notable examples of Federal and Late Victorian style architecture. Notable non-residential buildings include the Schwab Hotel (c. 1910), Hollidaysburg Trust Company (1873), Presbyterian Church (1841), Zion Lutheran Church (1907), Church of the Brethren (1911), Williamsburg High School (1918), and Community Elementary School (1941).  Also located in the district are Presbyterian (c. 1824), Methodist (c. 1831), Lutheran (c. 1835), and Lutheran and German Reformed (c. 1804) cemeteries; Big Spring; and the Pennsylvania Main Line Canal and Pennsylvania Railroad right-of-way.

It was added to the National Register of Historic Places in 1995.

References

Historic districts on the National Register of Historic Places in Pennsylvania
Federal architecture in Pennsylvania
Historic districts in Blair County, Pennsylvania
National Register of Historic Places in Blair County, Pennsylvania